Heavy Love might refer to:

Music
Albums
 Heavy Love (Duke Garwood album), an album by Duke Garwood 
 Heavy Love (Man Overboard album), an album by Man Overboard
 Heavy Love (Al Cohn and Jimmy Rowles album), an album by Al Cohn and Jimmy Rowles
 Heavy Love (Louise album), an album by Louise Redknapp

Songs
 "Heavy Love", a song by Metavari
 "Heavy Love", a song by David Ruffin from Who I Am
 "Heavy Love", a song by Serena Ryder from Harmony
 "Heavy Love", a song by Neil Young from Eldorado

Films
 Heavy Love, a film featuring Ton of Fun